Eswatini Posts and Telecommunications Corporation is a Eswatini (Swaziland) company that provides the two services under one corporate umbrella. The company, known as EPTC, is divided into four units: EswatiniPost, EswatiniTelecom, Phutfumani and Eswatini.net. The EPTC is a parastatal company and is responsible to the Ministry of Information, Communications and Technology. MTN Eswatini, a subsidiary of MTN Telecom in South Africa, is a competitor to the company.

EswatiniPost 
The post division offers modern mail service for letters, packets or other postal documents including post boxes, customs clearance, transport insurance or worldwide tracking and tracing.

EswatiniPost also offers money transfer by postal order or money order from person to person through all domestic post offices and also to neighbouring countries like South Africa, Lesotho and Botswana.

EswatiniPost also provides agency services on behalf of other companies. Agency services are provided throughout the postal network. The post offices sell contracts and receive payments for companies such as Eswatini Electricity Company (EEC), Eswatini Water Services Corporation (EWCS), Eswatini Television Authority (ESTVA) or EswatiniTelecom. There are also Internet Cafés with access to high-speed Internet in all communication centres and selected post offices.

EswatiniTelecom 
EswatiniTelecom offers telecom and internet services.  The company's website offers the Phone Spaza system for leasing phone lines for entrepreneurs who wish to offer telecommunication services to customers on a paying basis. The Lunyazi program is a wireless local loop service, offering wireless telephony and internet services on different service levels including Supercharge Lunyazi which provides integrated services digital network access at 144 kbit/s.

Phutfumani 
Phutfumani is a domestic and international courier and freight service. Contract customers can arrange pick-ups and deliveries according to schedule. All other customers can drop off their shipments at the existing Phutfumani Couriers offices or the nearest post office.

Eswatini.net 
The internet department is an Internet service provider. It offers special school rates, and connection to Eswatini.net priced on the basis of speed of connection. Eswatini.net also offers ADSL broadband, web hosting and domain name hosting.

Eswatini.net is the internet gateway of the EPTC. It connects Eswatini with the internet backbone in Great Britain. A backup connection to Telkom South Africa is used to improve speed and reliability.

Logos of the units of Eswatini Posts and Telecommunications Corporation

References

External links 
 

Logistics companies of Eswatini
Postal organizations
Telecommunications companies of Eswatini